Blaauwkrantz Pass is a mountain pass on the R67, situated in the Blaauwkrantz Nature Reserve in the Eastern Cape, on the road between Grahamstown and Port Alfred. It traverses the Bloukrans River valley.

History 
Nearby was the site of the Blaauwkrantz Bridge disaster of 1911.

External links 
 The Blaauwkrantz bridge disaster

References 

Mountain passes of the Eastern Cape